Peter Stickles (born October 8, 1976) is an American actor. He is best known for his role as the voyeuristic Caleb in the John Cameron Mitchell film Shortbus and as Damian, leader of a gay vampire cult, in the Here TV original series The Lair.

Career
Stickles was cast in Shortbus in 2003 from amongst some 400 actors who submitted audition tapes for the film, which was initially known as "Sex Film Project." No script had been written prior to casting and the story was built out of improvisational sessions once the cast was in place. The voyeuristic aspect of Caleb's character grew in part out of Stickles's own interests at the time. "I was exploring sex clubs at the time and not necessarily participating but watching from afar. I think John Cameron Mitchell was attracted to the idea of this whole voyeuristic aspect of the character. ... How far would you go to touch somebody from afar?"

Stickles, along with others in the cast, was nominated for the Gotham Independent Film Award for Best Ensemble Cast.

Stickles stars in The Lair, which premiered on here! in June 2007. His character, Damian, is the leader of a gay vampire cult. The series, although not critically well-reviewed, was renewed for a second season which premiered in late 2008.

Stickles has appeared in a number of low-budget and direct-to-video horror films, including such titles as Meat Weed Madness (2006) and its sequel Meat Weed America (2007), and has four films slated for release in 2008. He also appeared in the exercise video The Bedroom Workout for Men: Better Sex Through Exercise.

Personal life 

Stickles is openly gay. He has been married to magician Michael Carbonaro since 2014.

Filmography

References

External links
 
Peter Stickles interview on Pop Entertainment
Peter Stickles interview in Philadelphia (video)
Peter co-stars in Steve Balderson's WATCH OUT

1976 births
Living people
American male film actors
American male television actors
American gay actors
Male actors from New York City